Therese Krones (7 October 1801 – 28 December 1830) was an Austrian actress.

Life and career
She was born 7 October 1801 in Bruntál to parents who were engaged in the theatrical business, Franz Josef Krones (1766–1839) and his wife Anna Theresia Walter (* 1770). The actor Josef Krones was her brother.

After several provincial tours she appeared at the Leopoldstädter Theater in Vienna, where she played with Ferdinand Raimund, who greatly influenced her technique.

In 1821, she made her debut in the play Das lustige Trauerspiel Evakathel und Prinz Schnudi oder die Belagerung von Ypsilon by Philipp Hafner.

She wrote several plays: Sylphide, das See-Fräulein (1828), Der Branntweinbrenner und der Nebelgeist (1829), and Kleopatra (1830).

Krones died 28 December 1830 in Vienna after a short but serious illness of stomach, aged only 29. She was buried at the St. Marx Cemetery, and in 1930 was exhumed and reburied in an honorary grave in the Vienna Zentralfriedhof.

References

External links

19th-century Austrian actresses
Austrian stage actresses
Austrian women dramatists and playwrights
People from Bruntál
Burials at the Vienna Central Cemetery
1801 births
1830 deaths
Silesian-German people
19th-century Austrian dramatists and playwrights
19th-century Austrian women writers